Amanda Francisca Cerna Gamboa (born 3 September 1998) is a T47 class Paralympian for Chile. She received a silver medal for Chile at the 2019 Parapan American Games, she is also a World Junior champion and competed at 2016 and 2020 Summer Paralympics, her highest achievement at the Paralympic Games was finishing fourth in the 400m T47 at the 2016 Summer Paralympics.

References
 

Living people
1998 births
Sportspeople from Santiago
Chilean female sprinters
Paralympic athletes of Chile
Sprinters with limb difference
Paralympic sprinters
Athletes (track and field) at the 2016 Summer Paralympics
Athletes (track and field) at the 2020 Summer Paralympics
Medalists at the 2019 Parapan American Games